Watermelon seed oil is extracted by pressing from the seeds of the Citrullus lanatus (watermelon). It is particularly common in West Africa, where it is also called ootanga oil. 

The common watermelon most likely originated almost 5,000 years ago in the Kalahari Desert.  Its wild ancestor, the Kalahari Melon, still grows there, and its seeds are pressed for their oil.  Watermelons migrated north through Egypt, and during the Roman era they were cultivated and prized. 

Like their wild ancestors, modern domestic watermelon seeds can be pressed for oil.  Traditionally, the seeds are extracted from the seed casing, and dried in the sun. Once dried, the seeds are pressed.

Watermelon seed oil contains high amounts of unsaturated fatty acids, primarily linoleic and oleic acids.

See also
 List of melon dishes and foods

References

Watermelons
Vegetable oils
Melon production